The Honda 500 twins are a series of straight-twin motorcycles made by Honda since 2013.
 CB500F standard/naked bike
 CB500X adventure touring bike
 CBR500R sport bike
 CMX500 Rebel bobber

These models are sold in Japan with smaller capacity 399 cc engines: CB400F (2013–2016), CB400X, and CBR400R. Their introduction coincided with new European licensing regulations establishing a mid-range class of motorcycles of limited power. The new 500 twins are similar to the earlier CB500 parallel-twins discontinued in 2003, but all-new from the ground up.  They are made in Thailand, where Honda had previously made only smaller displacement motorcycles.

All models use the same  180° crank straight-twin engine with capacity and power below the A2 European driving licence limit.  They share the same six-speed gearbox and the majority of cycle parts. The CB500X has a larger fuel tank and longer front suspension travel making it taller, and with more ground clearance.

On its release, the CBR500R was the one-design model the European Junior Cup in 2013 and 2014.  Since 2014, Honda has partnered with local organisers to promote national CBR500R Cup events in Brazil and France; raced over various circuits, the competitions are open to amateurs from 13-years upwards.

Model history
The three models were announced on the eve of the November 2012 EICMA show in Milan.

2013
April: CB500F, CBR500R released; July: CB500X released

2016
EURO 4 compliance with smaller exhaust, LED headlamp, preload adjustable front suspension, smaller side covers, larger fuel tank on CB500F and CBR500R, Fireblade style fairing on the CBR500R

2019
Revised exhaust system, anti-rebound clutch, full LED lighting, revised rear shocks, new LCD instrumentation with additional features, 19" front wheel on the ruggedized CB500X, dual-channel ABS standard on all models in most markets, although for 2017 USA models, it remained an option.

2022
Inverted Showa Separate Function Fork - Big Piston (SFF-BP) forks, dual 296mm disk with axial calipers up front, updated triple tree clamps, new fuel injection settings that further increase torque feel and overall character, other changes include a lighter swingarm, lighter radiator, revised shock settings, redesigned and lighter front wheel, more powerful LEDs. The US Market only received the Pearl Organic Green colorway for 2022. 

Reactions
Since its launch, the range received many favourable reviews; some preferring the taller X model while the sporty R model was one of Honda's top selling bikes in Canada during 2015  and best selling sports bike in Australia. Many commentators, especially in off-road and long distance touring, argued the need for such middleweight bikes. Perhaps as a consequence, in 2015, RallyRaid, a British after-market specialist, created upgrade kits for the R & F machines and a full adventure conversion kit for the X model.

Multiple small improvements in the 2019 range impressed commentators with MCN describing the CB500X as an exceptional machine.

Specifications
All specifications are manufacturer claimed unless otherwise specified.  The motorcycle model designation is printed on a sticker under the seat.

References 

CB500 (2013)
Standard motorcycles
Motorcycles introduced in 1993
Motorcycles powered by straight-twin engines